First Baptist Church is a historic church at 709 Martin Luther King, Jr. Street in Selma, Alabama.  A historically African American Baptist church, it was built in the Gothic Revival style in 1894 and known for its association with the Civil Rights Movement. It was added to the National Register of Historic Places in 1979.

From the National Register of Historic Places Inventory — Nomination Form:

References

Baptist churches in Alabama
Churches on the National Register of Historic Places in Alabama
National Register of Historic Places in Dallas County, Alabama
Churches completed in 1894
Churches in Dallas County, Alabama
Selma to Montgomery marches
1894 establishments in Alabama